The 2022 The Citadel Bulldogs football team represented The Citadel as a member of the Southern Conference (SoCon) during the 2022 NCAA Division I FCS football season. The Bulldogs were led by seventh-year head coach Brent Thompson and played their home games at Johnson Hagood Stadium in Charleston, South Carolina.

Previous season

The Bulldogs finished the 2021 season with a record of 4–7, 3–5 SoCon play to finish in a tied for seventh place.

Schedule

Game summaries

at Campbell

No. 9 East Tennessee State

at No. 20 Mercer

at Appalachian State

Furman

at Wofford

at Western Carolina

No. 13 Samford

No. 11 Chattanooga

Virginia-Lynchburg

at VMI

References

Citadel
The Citadel Bulldogs football seasons
Citadel Bulldogs football